Rivomarginella morrisoni is a species of freshwater snail, gastropod mollusk in the family Marginellidae, the margin snails.

Rivomarginella morrisoni is the type species of the genus Rivomarginella.

Distribution
It is native to central Thailand: Mae Klong River, Prachin Buri River, Nan River, Klong Bang O, Klong Ban Yikkan, Klong Prapa, Klong Rapipat.

The type locality is Prachin Buri River, Kabin Buri District, Thailand.

Description
The height of the shell is 5.4 - 11.3 mm.

Ecology
Rivomarginella morrisoni lives in rivers, lakes, and canals.

References

Marginellidae
Gastropods described in 1968